Adeyemo Fatai is a male former table tennis player from Nigeria. From 1985 to 1994 he won several medals in singles, doubles, and team events in the African Table Tennis Championships. He competed in men's doubles at the 1988 Summer Olympics.

See also
 List of table tennis players

References

External links
 
 
 
 

Year of birth missing (living people)
Living people
Nigerian male table tennis players
Olympic table tennis players of Nigeria
Table tennis players at the 1988 Summer Olympics